"My Boy" is the debut single by American country music singer Elvie Shane. It was released to country radio on September 21, 2020, as the first single from his debut album Backslider, which was released on October 29, 2021. Shane wrote the song with Lee Starr, Nick Columbia and Russell Sutton, while Oscar Charles produced it. The single went platinum in 2022.

Background
Shane wrote "My Boy" in 2016, elaborating that it was "inspired by a Facebook post" sent to him that read "I don't have a step-son, I have a son that was born before I met him". Shane said: "I took that to a few of my friends, and I resonated with that being a step father myself, and 3 out of the 4 of us that wrote it could identify with the song somehow." On June 15, 2022 the Recording Industry Association of America certified the song platinum.

Content
"My Boy" is a ballad about the role of a stepfather and the love for his son.

Music video
The music video premiered on December 18, 2020, directed by Peter Zavadil. Shane plays a background character (the car mechanic) who is working along side of a truck driver who has a strong bond with and love for his stepson. Shane is also seen as a character sitting in the bleachers at the kid's ballgame.

Charts

Weekly charts

Year-end charts

Certifications

References

2020s ballads
2020 debut singles
2020 songs
Country ballads
Elvie Shane songs
BBR Music Group singles
Songs about fathers